Krzysztof Szewczyk (born 6 March 1996) is a Polish footballer who plays as a forward for Wieczysta Kraków.

External links

References

1996 births
Living people
Association football forwards
Polish footballers
Ekstraklasa players
II liga players
I liga players
MKS Cracovia (football) players
OKS Stomil Olsztyn players
Puszcza Niepołomice players
Garbarnia Kraków players
Wieczysta Kraków players
People from Bochnia
Sportspeople from Lesser Poland Voivodeship